Monong is a village in Kgalagadi District of Botswana. It is located in Kalahari Desert, and it has a primary school. The population was 267 in 2011 census.

References

Kgalagadi District
Villages in Botswana